Michael Lee Oquist (born May 30, 1968) is an American former professional baseball pitcher who played from -. He played for the Baltimore Orioles, San Diego Padres, and Oakland Athletics of Major League Baseball (MLB).

Career
Oquist played collegiate baseball at the University of Arkansas prior to turning professional.

On August 3, 1998, Oquist gave up 14 earned runs to the New York Yankees. Oquist allowed 14 runs on 16 hits, with the most being in the 2nd inning (7). He struck out three batters while walking three and allowing four home runs on 115 pitches. The four relievers that closed the game out for the Athletics allowed a combined total of one hit, one walk, and four strikeouts. Conversely, Orlando Hernandez, the pitcher for the Yankees, pitched a complete game while allowing a run on three hits with eight strikeouts. He threw 123 pitches while Oquist (five days removed from his previous pitching appearance) threw 115. His final game score was a -21, while his ERA ballooned from 5.87 to 6.61.

References

External links

1968 births
Living people
American expatriate baseball players in Canada
Arkansas Razorbacks baseball players
Baseball players from Colorado
Baltimore Orioles players
Edmonton Trappers players
Erie Orioles players
Frederick Keys players
Hagerstown Suns players
Las Vegas Stars (baseball) players
Major League Baseball pitchers
Midland RockHounds players
Modesto A's players
Oakland Athletics players
People from La Junta, Colorado
Rochester Red Wings players
San Diego Padres players
Somerset Patriots players
Toledo Mud Hens players
Vancouver Canadians players